Cleonymia chabordis is a moth of the family Noctuidae. The species was first described by Charles Oberthür in 1876. It is found in North Africa, the Near East and Middle East, the Arabian Peninsula, Iran, Jordan and
Israel.

Adults are on wing from January to April. There is one generation per year.

External links

Cuculliinae
Moths described in 1876
Moths of the Middle East